Jacqueline Renee Harbord (born 1944) is a British former competitive figure skater. She is the 1962 British national champion and placed seventh at the 1963 European Championships. Harbord, from Brixton, turned professional later in 1963. She trained in Streatham.

Competitive highlights

References

External links

British female single skaters
Living people
People from Brixton
1944 births